HP X-Terminals are a line of X terminals from Hewlett Packard introduced in the early- to mid-1990s, including the 700/X and 700/RX, Envizex and Entria, and the Envizex II and Entria II.  They were often sold alongside PA-RISC-based HP 9000 Unix systems. The primary use case was connecting several graphical consoles to a single server or workstation to allow multiple users access the same (expensive) processing system from (less expensive) terminal systems. These X-Terminals all allowed high-resolution, color-graphics access to the main server from which they downloaded their operating system and necessary program files. All models featured limited expandability, in most cases additional I/O options for peripherals and memory for more programs or local storage. HP did not use its own PA-RISC platform for these systems, the first design used an Intel CISC processor, while all later systems used RISC platforms, first Intel i960 and later the popular MIPS.

These 1990s X-Terminals, together with offerings from many other vendors from that time, were precursors to thin computing:  the use of small dumb front-end systems for I/O and a larger processing system as back-end, shared by many concurrent users.

700/X
These were the first X-Terminals HP produced, featuring a similar case to that of some HP 9000/300
(Motorola 68000-based) workstations.
They were driven by a pretty obscure CPU combination, an Intel 186 with a TI DSP
as video coprocessor.

 CPU: 16 MHz Intel 80186 with a 60 MHz Texas Instruments DSP as video processor
 RAM: 1MB on board, 9MB maximum; one slot takes up to 8MB modules of unknown type
 Video RAM: Unknown
 Maximum video resolution/color-depth: 1024×768/8-bit
 I/O connectors: RS-232 serial, HIL and two PS/2 for keyboard/mouse devices, AUI and BNC 10 Mbit Ethernet connectors and VGA video connector
 Expansion: Unknown

700/RX

These are the direct successors to the 700/X line of X-Terminals and changed the architecture significantly.
They were the first in a line of terminals to be driven by an Intel i960 RISC CPU and introduced a case which also was used on later systems. They have a (albeit very quiet) fan.

Several submodels were available, featuring different video-options:

 16Ca: 1 MB video RAM, max. 1028×768 resolution, 8-bit color-depth
 19Ca: 2 MB video RAM, max. 1280×1024 resolution, 8-bit color-depth
 14Ci/16Ci/17Ci: 1 MB video RAM, max. 1028×768 resolution, 8-bit color-depth
 19Mi: 0.2 MB video RAM, max. 1280×1024 resolution, monographics

All models have these base features in common:
 CPU: 22 MHz Intel i960CA with 1KB instruction cache
 RAM: 2 MB on board, 34 MB maximum; two slots take each up to 16 MB 72-pin non-parity SIMMs
 I/O connectors: RS232 serial, HIL and two PS/2 for keyboard/mouse devices, parallel for printer, AUI and BNC 10 Mbit Ethernet and VGA video connector
 Expansion: slot for a Boot-ROM cartridge

Entria
The Entrias were the low-cost line of X-Terminals, featuring the same architecture as the 700/RX terminals, but in a plastic case the same style as the HP 9000/712 workstation. They are very small and quiet.

The Entrias were available in different video configurations, depending on the exact model:
 0.6 MB video RAM: max. resolution of 1024×768 with grayscale graphics
 1 MB video RAM: max. resolution of 1024×768 with 8-bit color depth
 2 MB video RAM: max. resolution of 1280×1024 with 8-bit color depth

Common:
 CPU: Intel i960CA with 1 KB instruction cache
 RAM: 4 MB on board, 68 MB maximum; two slots take each up to 32 MB 72-pin non-parity SIMMs
 I/O connectors: RS-232 serial, two PS/2 for keyboard/mouse devices, parallel for printer, TP and BNC 10 Mbit Ethernet and VGA video connector
 Expansion: none

Envizex

The Envizex were the successors to the 700/RX terminals, featuring the same flat pizzabox case and a slightly modified architecture with a faster version of the Intel i960 RISC CPU.
They have a (very quiet) fan inside.

Three different series were available which featured different speeds of the CPU:
 i SERIES: 25 MHz Intel i960CF with 4 KB instruction and 1 KB data cache
 a SERIES: 28 MHz Intel i960CF with 4 KB instruction and 1 KB data cache
 p SERIES: 33 MHz Intel i960CF with 4 KB instruction and 1 KB data cache

Common aspects:
 RAM: a and i SERIES: 4 MB on board, 132 MB maximum; four slots take each up to 32 MB 72-pin non-parity SIMMs. p SERIES: 6 MB on board, 102 MB maximum; three  slots take each up to 32 MB 72-pin non-parity SIMMs
 Video RAM: 2 MB
 Maximum video resolution/color-depth: 1280×1024 (i SERIES might do only 1024×768) 8-bit
 I/O connectors: two RS-232 serial, HIL and two PS/2 for keyboard/mouse devices, parallel for printer, TP, AUI and BNC 10 Mbit Ethernet and VGA video connector
 Expansion: They offer a range of expansion options:
 3.5″ PC floppy drive
 CD-quality audio support
 Either one of the following three cards:
 SCSI/ROM adapter card
 Token Ring adapter
 100VG AnyLan adapter (HP-proprietary 100 MBit networking)
 They also have two PCMCIA sockets for:
 Boot-ROM card
 SRAM cards which contain fonts or a local copy of the X server (no network download necessary)

Entria II

These were the successors of the low-cost Entria X-Terminals, keeping their HP 9000/712-style small footprint plastic case.
The system architecture was changed completely and is shared with the later Envizex II terminals. It is based around a NEC R4300 CPU and PCI-based I/O devices.

 CPU: 100 MHz NEC R4300
 RAM: 64 MB maximum; two slots take each up to 32 MB 168-pin DIMMs (PC66/100/133 DIMMs in different sizes can be used, but only 8 MB of each module will be available; the larger modules (16 and 32 MB) were HP-proprietary)
 Video RAM: 2 MB
 Maximum video resolution/color-depth: 1280×1024/8-bit
 I/O connectors: RS-232 serial, two PS/2 for keyboard/mouse devices, parallel for printer, TP Ethernet (probably 10 Mbit) connector and VGA video connector
 Expansion: none

Envizex II

These are the bigger brothers of the Entria II X-Terminals, driven by the same R4300 MIPS CPU and PCI I/O architecture.
The case was redesigned, is very easy to open and does not have any fans, making the terminal rather quiet.

 CPU: 133 MHz NEC R4300
 RAM: 96 MB maximum; three slots take each up to 32 MB 168-pin DIMMs (PC66/100/133 DIMMs in different sizes can be used, but only 8 MB of each module will be available; the larger modules (16 and 32 MB) were also HP-proprietary)
 Video RAM: 2 or 4 MB VSIMM
 Video chipset: ATI Mach64
 Maximum video resolution/color-depth: 1600×1200/16-bit
 I/O connectors: two RS-232 serial, two PS/2 and USB for keyboard/mouse devices, TP Ethernet connector and EVC video connector (requires an adapter-cable to use standard VGA monitors)
 Expansion:
 3.5″ PC floppy drive
 Audio Kit with telephone I/O
 Flash DIMMs card for booting and storing configuration and font files
 100VG AnyLan PCI card
 100 Mbit Ethernet PCI card
 Combined BNC and AUI card (expands the onboard NIC)

Software

These X-Terminals/stations run a proprietary operating system from HP — Netstation, formerly Enware, with some versions apparently based on VxWorks (probably those with RISC support).

This software runs on theoretically any Unix system, native support is available for HP-UX 10, HP-UX 11, IBM AIX and Solaris 2.x. A generic installation image is provided for other Unix flavors; this can be used to install the software via the provided installation shell script on for instance various Linux or BSD flavors.

Netstation Version 7.1

The older Enware/Netstation Version 7.1, HP product B.07.11, supports the following i960-based terminals:
 700/RX
 Entria
 Envizex

It was downloadable from a public HP FTP service (hprc.external.hp.com/B.07.11/), which however was apparently discontinued.

Read the included documentation and technical reference and refer to the installation instructions. Generally, a Unix server is needed from which the station can boot its kernel and load its X server.
This is done via TFTP; the station can be managed locally via a configuration screen or remotely on the server via customizable configuration files.

Netstation Version 9.0

The most current available Netstation version is 9.0, HP product B.09.11. This version supports the newer MIPS-based X-Terminals:
 Entria II
 Envizex II

Same as with the older Netstation software, version 9.0 was available from a HP FTP service, which was discontinued. (See above)

The newer X-Terminals (IIs) can boot in different ways, over a NFS mount, a SMB share or plain TFTP.
Included in the Netstation software is a native Java environment which makes execution of local Java applets on the terminal possible.

References

Specific references:

General references:

http://www.openpa.net/

External links
 700/RX and envizex Terminal password unlocking (Bart Dopheide: n.d. Accessed September 2008)
 Setting up the Envizex (N.a.: January 2008. Link updated July 2013) Installation instructions for the HP X-Terminal software
 Information and Software for HP Envizex, Entria, and 700/RX X-Terminals (Brian McElroy: April 2000. Access September 2008)
 Updated HP Envizex files and basic config (James Baker: Posted July 2013)

X-Terminals
X Window System